Robert Maurice Lipson Winston, Baron Winston,  (born 15 July 1940) is a British professor, medical doctor, scientist, television presenter and Labour peer.

Early life
Robert Winston was born in London to Laurence Winston and Ruth Winston-Fox, and brought up as an Orthodox Jew. His mother was Mayor of the former Borough of Southgate. Winston's father died as a result of medical negligence when Winston was nine years old. Robert has two younger siblings: a sister, the artist Willow Winston, and a brother, Anthony.

Winston attended firstly Salcombe Preparatory School until the age of 7, followed by Colet Court and St Paul's School, later graduating from The London Hospital Medical College in 1964 with a degree in medicine and surgery and achieved prominence as an expert in human fertility. For a brief time he gave up clinical medicine and worked as a theatre director, winning the National Directors' Award at the Edinburgh Festival in 1969.

Medical career
Winston joined Hammersmith Hospital as a registrar in 1970 as a Wellcome Research Fellow. He became an associate professor at the Catholic University of Leuven, Belgium in 1975. He was a scientific advisor to the World Health Organisation's programme in human reproduction from 1975 to 1977. He joined the Royal Postgraduate Medical School (based at Hammersmith Hospital) as consultant and Reader in 1977.

After conducting research as Professor of Gynaecology at the University of Texas Health Science Center at San Antonio in 1980, he returned to the UK to run the IVF service set up at Hammersmith Hospital which pioneered various improvements in this technology.  He became Dean of the Institute of Obstetrics and Gynaecology in London until its merger with Imperial College in 1997. He was  Director of NHS Research and Development at the Hammersmith Hospitals Trust until 1994. As Professor of Fertility Studies at Hammersmith, Winston led the IVF team that pioneered pre-implantation genetic diagnosis to identify defects in human embryos, and published early work on gene expression in human embryos. He developed tubal microsurgery and various techniques in reproductive surgery, including sterilisation reversal. He performed the world's first Fallopian tubal transplant in 1979 but this technology was later superseded by in vitro fertilisation. Together with Alan Handyside in 1990, his research group pioneered the techniques of pre-implantation diagnosis, enabling screening of human embryos to prevent numerous genetic diseases.

He was the president of the British Association for the Advancement of Science from 2004 to 2005. Together with Carol Readhead of the California Institute of Technology, Winston researched male germ cell stem cells and methods for their genetic modification at the Institute of Reproductive and Developmental Biology, Imperial College London. He has published over 300 scientific papers in peer-reviewed journals. He was appointed to a new chair at Imperial College – Professor of Science and Society – and is also emeritus professor of Fertility Studies there. He was Chairman of the Institute of Obstetrics and Gynaecology Trust and chairs the Women-for-Women Appeal.  This charitable trust, which has raised over £80 million for research into reproductive diseases, was renamed the Genesis Research Trust in 1997. From 2001 to 2018 he was Chancellor of Sheffield Hallam University.

Winston is a Fellow of the Academy of Medical Sciences (FMedSci), an Honorary Fellow of the Royal Academy of Engineering (HonFREng), a Fellow of the Royal College of Obstetricians and Gynaecologists (FRCOG) and of the Royal College of Physicians of London (FRCP), and is an Honorary Fellow of the Royal College of Surgeons (FRCS Edin), Royal College of Physicians and Surgeons (FRCPS Glasg), and the Royal Society of Biology (FRSB). He holds honorary doctorates from twenty-three universities. He is a trustee of the UK Stem Cell Foundation. He is a patron of The Liggins Institute, University of Auckland, New Zealand.

Winston holds strong views about the commercialisation of fertility treatment. He believes that ineffective treatments result in great anguish to couples and is alarmed that so many treatments for the symptom of infertility are carried out before proper investigation and diagnosis has been made.  He is also sceptical about the effectiveness of current methods for screening human embryos to assess their viability.

Winston has called sex reassignment surgery "mutilation" and has said that "we can remove bits of our body and change our shape and so on but you can't change your sex because that is embedded in your genes in every cell of your body."

Media career

Winston was the presenter of many BBC television series, including Your Life in Their Hands, Making Babies, Superhuman, The Secret Life of Twins, Child of Our Time, Human Instinct, The Human Mind, Frontiers of Medicine and the BAFTA award-winner The Human Body. As a traditional Jew with an orthodox background, he also presented The Story of God, exploring the development of religious beliefs and the status of faith in a scientific age.

He presented the BBC documentary Walking with Cavemen, a major BBC series that presented some controversial views about early man but was endorsed by leading anthropologists and scientists. One theory was that Homo sapiens have a uniquely developed imagination that helped them to survive.

Winston's documentary Threads of Life won the international science film prize in Paris in 2005. His BBC series Child Against All Odds explored ethical questions raised by IVF treatment. In 2008, he presented Super Doctors, about decisions made every day in frontier medicine.

In 2007, Winston appeared in the TV series Play It Again, in which he attempted to learn to play the saxophone, despite not having played a musical instrument since the age of 11, when he learned the recorder.

Among many BBC Radio 4 programmes, he has appeared on The Archers radio soap as a fertility consultant. He has regularly appeared on The Wright Stuff as a panellist as well as numerous chat show programmes such as Have I Got News For You, This Morning, The One Show and various political programmes such as Question Time and Any Questions. Winston is featured in the Symphony of Science episode Ode to the Brain.

He also took part in the 2011 TV series Jamie's Dream School. In recent years, Winston has been featured on The Late Late Show with James Corden in the United States, presenting various entertaining scientific experiments.

Political career
Winston was created a life peer on 18 December 1995 as Baron Winston, of Hammersmith in the London Borough of Hammersmith and Fulham. He sits on the Labour Party benches in the House of Lords and takes the Labour whip. He speaks frequently in the House of Lords on education, science, medicine and the arts. He was Chairman of the House of Lords Select Committee on Science and Technology and is a board member and vice-chairman of the Parliamentary Office of Science and Technology, which provides advice to both Houses of Parliament. He is a member of Labour Friends of Israel.

Winston has made a number of claims regarding the impact of segregated cycle lanes on air quality and emissions in Central London. He is a member of the Centre for Data Ethics and Innovation, an advisory board created in 2019 and sponsored by the Department for Digital, Culture, Media and Sport, which works on ethical and innovative deployment of data-enabled technologies including artificial intelligence.

Personal life
In 1973, Winston married Lira Helen Feigenbaum (born 8 August 1949). They had three children, Joel, Tanya and Ben who is a film and TV producer and director. Lady Winston died on 9 December 2021. Winston is a fan of Arsenal Football Club. He is a Fellow of the Royal Society of Arts, a former vice-president of the Royal College of Music and a member of the Garrick Club, the MCC, and the Athenaeum Club in London. He owns a classic 1930s Bentley.

Winston was a council member of the Imperial Cancer Research Fund and Cancer Research UK, and until 2013 was a member of the Engineering & Physical Sciences Research Council where he chaired the Societal Issues Panel. He gives many public lectures a year on scientific subjects and has helped to promote science literacy and education by founding the Reach Out Laboratory in Imperial College, which brings schoolchildren of all ages into the university on a daily basis to do practical science and to debate the issues which science and technology raise. Extending this school outreach activity, he acts as ambassador for Outreach for the President of Imperial College, visiting schools across England to discuss scientific issues and career aspiration with students.

Current posts
Professor of Science and Society, Imperial College London
Emeritus Professor of Fertility Studies, Imperial College London
Chairman of the Genesis Research Trust
Founding member and co-chair with Professor Ruth Armon of the UK-Israel Science Council (since 2017)

Selected former posts 

Chairman of the Council, Royal College of Music 2007–2017
Council Member, University of Surrey until 2018

Honours and awards

Cedric Carter Medal, Clinical Genetics Society, 1993
Victor Bonney Medal for contributions to surgery, Royal College of Surgeons, 1993
Gold Medallist, Royal Society of Health, 1998
Fellow of the Academy of Medical Sciences (FMedSci), 1998
British Medical Association Gold Award for Medicine in the Media, 1999
Michael Faraday Prize, Royal Society, 1999
Edwin Stevens Medal (the Royal Society of Medicine) 2003
Aventis Prize, Royal Society 2004
Al-Hammadi Medal, Royal College of Surgeons of Edinburgh 2005
Twenty-three honorary doctorates
The VLV Award for the most outstanding personal contribution to British television in 2004 
Honoured by the City of Westminster at a Marylebone tree planting ceremony in July 2011
Honorary Fellow of the Royal Academy of Engineering in 2008.

Honorary degrees
Winston has received at least 23 honorary degrees, These include

Television documentaries
 Your Life in Their Hands, BBC 1979–1987
 Making Babies, BBC 1995
 The Human Body, BBC, which went by the name Intimate Universe: The Human Body in the United States, BBC 1998. The series won three BAFTA Awards.
 The Secret Life of Twins, BBC 1999
 Child of Our Time, following the lives of a group of children, all born in 2000, as they grow to the age of 20; BBC 2000–present
 Superhuman, BBC 2001, won the Wellcome Trust Award for Medicine and Biology
 Walking with Cavemen, BBC 2003
 Human Instinct, BBC 2002 Emmy nomination
 The Human Mind, BBC 2003
 Threads of Life, about DNA, BBC 2003, won the international Science Prize in Paris
 How to Sleep Better, BBC 2005
 The Story of God, BBC 2005
 How to Improve Your Memory, BBC 2006
 A Child Against All Odds, BBC 2006
 Super Doctors, BBC 2008
 How Science Changed Our World, BBC 2010
 Inside Britain's Fertility Business, BBC 2016

Selected published work
"Reversibility of Female Sterilization" (1978)
Co-author "Tubal Infertility" (1981)
"Infertility – a sympathetic approach" (1985)
"Getting Pregnant" (1989)
"Making Babies" (1996)
"The IVF Revolution" (1999)
"Superhuman" (2000)
"Human Instinct" (2003)
"The Human Mind" (2004), shortlisted for Royal Society Aventis Prize
"What Makes Me Me" (2005), winner, Royal Society young people's book prize
"Human" (2005), BMA Award for best popular medicine book
"The Story of God" (2005) 
"Body" (2005)
"A Child Against All Odds" (2006)
"Play It Again" (2007)
"It's Elementary" (2007)
"Evolution Revolution" (2009)
"What Goes On Inside My head" (2010)
"Science Year By Year" (2011)
"That's Life" (2012)
"Bad Ideas?" An Arresting History of Our Inventions: How Our Finest Inventions Nearly Finished Us Off (2010)
"Utterly Amazing Science" (2014), winner, Royal Society young people's book prize
"Utterly Amazing Body" (2015)
"The Essential Fertility Guide" (2015)
When science meets God, Robert Winston, BBC News, Friday, 2 December 2005.
Why do we believe in God?, Robert Winston, The Guardian, Thursday, 13 October 2005

References

External links

President of the BA, Biography at the British Association
Another biography at the BA
Age of the Sage: Robert Winston

1940 births
Living people
20th-century British Jews
21st-century British Jews
Academic staff of the Université catholique de Louvain
Academics of Imperial College London
Alumni of the London Hospital Medical College
BBC television presenters
British Orthodox Jews
British scientists
Chancellors of Sheffield Hallam University
Fellows of the Academy of Medical Sciences (United Kingdom)
Fellows of the Royal College of Physicians
Fellows of the Royal Society of Biology
Jewish scientists
Labour Friends of Israel
Labour Party (UK) life peers
Life peers created by Elizabeth II
People associated with the University of Surrey
People educated at St Paul's School, London
Physicians of Hammersmith Hospital
Presidents of the British Science Association
Television personalities from London